Gold Hill is an unincorporated community in Storey County, Nevada, located just south and downhill of Virginia City. Incorporated December 17, 1862, in order to prevent its annexation by its larger neighbor, the town at one point was home to at least 8,000 residents. Prosperity was sustained for a period of 20 years between 1868 and 1888 by mining the Comstock Lode, a major deposit of gold and silver ore. Mines such as the Yellow Jacket, Crown Point, and Belcher brought in over $10 million each in dividends. Historical remnants of the town can still be seen, including the Gold Hill Hotel, promoted as Nevada's oldest hotel, in existence since 1861; the former Bank of California building; the restored Virginia & Truckee Railroad depot; the Depression-Era Crown Point Mill; and remains of several of the mines and residences in various states of restoration and repair.

Although in the shadow of neighboring Virginia City, Gold Hill, nonetheless enjoyed a lively entertainment industry. The Gold Hill News was established in 1863, and Gold Hill enjoyed a theater by 1862. The demographic mirrored Virginia City where one third of the population was engaged in mining and the Irish immigrant dominated numerically.  Newspaperman Alfred Doten is associated with the town. His numerous journals, available at the University of Nevada, Reno Special Collections, provide a rich and detailed history of his experiences in the American West during the nineteenth century. One of the main settlements for the Cornish on the Comstock lode was in Gold Hill.

The Gold Hill post office remained in operation until 1943. Today Gold Hill exists as a shell of its former self; its population in 2005 was 191. It is part of the Reno–Sparks Metropolitan Statistical Area. 

A later mining complex in the area operated from 1927 until 1942, when mining operations were shut down by War Production Board order L-208, shutting down all nonessential gold mines in the United States. Just under a hundred million dollars' worth of ore was extracted after 1930.  Active mining has returned to lower Gold Hill, with the start of production at Comstock Mining's Lucerne, Hartford and Billy The Kid mines.

In 1976, Bob Gray, a former Marine Corps photographer in World War II and admirer of the Virginia & Truckee Railroad since he was a teenager, bought a section of the abandoned railway line between Virginia City and a point about two miles south.  He laid track on that right of way and began operating a steam-powered tourist railroad.  The track was extended to Gold Hill in 1992, and in 1994 the Gold Hill Historical Society was established to preserve the Gold Hill depot, one of the few wooden structures in the region that survived the 1875 fire in Virginia City.  After ten years of applying for grants, lobbying, and collecting steel rail donations by the Gold Hill Historical Society, the mayor of Carson City approved the letting out to bid of a contract to reconstruct the railroad between Gold Hill and the Carson River, fifteen miles away. Today Gold Hill is a stop on this tourist railroad, which operates historic steam trains attracting thousands of tourists each year.

Gold Hill is the birthplace of Marion Jones Farquhar (1879-1965), Olympic bronze medal winner and two-time U.S. Open tennis champion.

References

External links

 Picture of Gold Hill as a sprawling town circa 1875
 History of Gold Hill, Nevada at Western Mining History
 The Virginia and Truckee Railroad and its history.
 Gold Hill Hotel 360 Walk through - The Haunted Explorers

Unincorporated communities in Storey County, Nevada
History of Storey County, Nevada
Populated places established in 1862
Reno, NV Metropolitan Statistical Area
Virginia City, Nevada
1862 establishments in Nevada Territory
Unincorporated communities in Nevada